Martrecia Cherisse Alleyne (born 1991 in Saint Augustine) is an Afro-Trinidadians and Tobagonians model and beauty pageant who placed as the First Runner-up of Miss Trinidad & Tobago Universe 2017 in October 2017 in the Trinidad & Tobago.

Personal life
Alleyne lives in Saint Augustine, Trinidad & Tobago. She is former Valedictorian for the Faculty of Social Sciences at the University of the West Indies, St. Augustine.

Pageantry

Miss Trinidad & Tobago Universe 2017
Alleyne finished as the 1st Runner-up at Miss Universe Trinidad and Tobago 2017. Meanwhile, the official winner was Yvonne Clarke crowned as the 2017 winner and competed at Miss Universe 2017 in Las Vegas where she did not place in the top 16.

References

External links
misstrinidadandtobagouniverse
missuniverse.com
Martrecia Alleyne

Living people
1991 births
Trinidad and Tobago beauty pageant winners
Trinidad and Tobago female models